Chapel St. Leonards is a village and civil parish in the East Lindsey district of Lincolnshire, England. It also lies right next to the North Sea.

The village is a location for caravan park holidays as well as campsites, and is next to several miles of beach, and close to Fantasy Island, market towns, and the Lincolnshire Wolds.

It has a restored part of a major Second World War coastal defence line retaining the viewing platform. The adjacent North Sea Observatory, a futuristic, iconic visitors' centre using high quality materials and high-weatherproofing providing a comfortable facility for year-round use, was constructed between 2016 and 2018.

In recent years Chapel Point has become a location for birdwatchers, being visited by migrating birds such as the Mediterranean gull.

Governance 
An electoral ward of the same name exists. This ward stretches west to Hogsthorpe with a total population taken at the 2011 census of 4,684.

North Sea Observatory

The UK's first purpose-built marine observatory, it was first conceived in 2005 with plans revealed to the public in July 2013. Planning permission was granted at the end of 2014 with the build between 2016 and 2018 funded mainly from Lincolnshire County Council and additionally from Arts Council England and the Coastal Communities Fund.

It is the first stage of what is envisaged as part of the Lincolnshire Coastal Country Park (LCCP) with an intention to later develop the coastal walk as a visitor attraction northwards to Sandilands. The site is owned by Chapel St Leonards Parish Council and is leased to the County Council.

Included into the futuristic design having main viewing windows orientated towards the sea, the observatory has multi-function spaces allocated for an exhibition gallery and education, together with a local base for Coastwatch and a year-round cafe.

Despite a televised press-launch and announcements of opening 22 June, the centre did not open to the public, with several local journals carrying the same information from a Lincolnshire County Council press release citing further delays due to building snagging works. The centre finally opened 30 July 2018.

Chapel and church
The name of the village derives from a chapel at Mumby dedicated to St Leonard; the village history is tied to that of Mumby, both at one time being part of the same ecclesiastical parish.

The village Anglican church, also dedicated to St Leonard, was rebuilt in 1572 after a flood, and again rebuilt in 1794 on a smaller scale. There was further rebuilding in 1866 and in 1901 when the church was lengthened and the red-tiled tower, unique in Lincolnshire, was added. In 1924 the chapel was again enlarged and lengthened, and a new east window and reredos added. The present church holds parish registers dating from 1665, although bishop's transcripts go back as far as 1568.

Twinned Village 
Chapel St Leonards has been twinned since 1988 with Cérans-Foulletourte, a township in the Sarthe department in the region of Pays de la Loire, in north-western France.

Notes

References

Further reading
 Kime, Winston, The Book of Skegness, Ingoldmells, Addlethorpe and Chapel St Leonards (Buckingham: Barracuda Books, 1986).
 Massingberd, W. O., Court Rolls of the Manor of Ingoldmells in the County of Lincoln (London: Spottiswoode, 1902).
 Owen, A. E. B., "Salt, Sea Banks and Medieval Settlement on the Lindsey Coast", N. Field and A. White, eds., A Prospect of Lincolnshire (Lincoln: privately published, 1984), pp. 46–49.
 Pawley, Simon, "Lincolnshire Coastal Villages and the Sea c. 1300–c. 1600: Economy and Society" (PhD thesis, University of Leicester, 1984).
 Robinson, David N., The Book of the Lincolnshire Seaside: The Story of the Coastline from the Humber to the Wash (Barracuda, 1981).
 Robinson, David N., "The Changing Coastline", Dennis R. Mills (ed.), Twentieth Century Lincolnshire, History of Lincolnshire, no. 12 (Lincoln: History of Lincolnshire Committee of the Society for Lincolnshire History and Archaeology, 1989), pp. 155–180.

External links

Chapel St Leonards Website
Chapel St Leonards Carnival

Seaside resorts in England
Villages in Lincolnshire
Populated coastal places in Lincolnshire
Civil parishes in Lincolnshire
East Lindsey District